"How Many Times" is a song recorded by Canadian country music group Family Brown. It was released in 1990 as the second single from their album Life and Times 1982-1989. It peaked at number 3 on the RPM Country Tracks chart in April 1990.

Chart performance

Year-end charts

References

1989 songs
1990 singles
Family Brown songs
RCA Records singles
Songs written by Barry Brown (Canadian musician)